In Style is an album by saxophonist Sonny Stitt recorded in 1981 and released on the Muse label the following year.

Reception

Scott Yanow, in his review for AllMusic, stated "Sonny Stitt (heard on both alto and tenor) is in excellent form on this LP -- yet another quartet date. He led over 100 sessions through the years. With pianist Barry Harris, bassist George Duvivier, and drummer Jimmy Cobb inspiring him, Stitt is creative within the boundaries of bebop".

Track listing 
 "Western Style" (Sonny Stitt) – 4:46
 "I'll Walk Alone" (Jule Styne, Sammy Cahn) – 5:39
 "Just You, Just Me" (Jesse Greer, Raymond Klages) – 4:56
 "The Good Life" (Sacha Distel, Jack Reardon) – 2:49
 "Is You Is or Is You Ain't My Baby" (Louis Jordan, Bill Austin) – 5:01
 "Killing Me Softly with His Song" (Charles Fox, Norman Gimbel) – 4:11
 "Eastern Style" (Stitt) – 3:39
 "Yesterdays" (Jerome Kern, Otto Harbach) – 6:19

Personnel 
Sonny Stitt - alto saxophone (tracks 2, 4 & 6), tenor saxophone (tracks 1, 3, 5, 7 & 8)
Barry Harris - piano
George Duvivier - bass 
Jimmy Cobb - drums

References 

1982 albums
Muse Records albums
Sonny Stitt albums
Albums recorded at Van Gelder Studio
Albums produced by Bob Porter (record producer)